John W. Leezer (c. 1873 – August 8, 1938) was an American cinematographer active during the silent era. He is credited with shooting at least thirty-three films for Paramount Pictures, Fine Arts, the Brentwood Film Corporation, and Robertson-Cole Pictures, among others.

Partial filmography

External links
 
 

1870s births
1938 deaths
American cinematographers